Riemann invariants are mathematical transformations made on a system of conservation equations to make them more easily solvable. Riemann invariants are constant along the characteristic curves of the partial differential equations where they obtain the name invariant. They were first obtained by Bernhard Riemann in his work on plane waves in gas dynamics.

Mathematical theory

Consider the set of conservation equations:

It will be asked if it is possible to rewrite this equation to

To do this curves will be introduced in the  plane defined by the vector field . The term in the brackets will be rewritten in terms of a total derivative where  are parametrized as 

comparing the last two equations we find

which can be now written in characteristic form

where we must have the conditions

where  can be eliminated to give the necessary condition

so for a nontrivial solution is the determinant

For Riemann invariants we are concerned with the case when the matrix  is an identity matrix to form

notice this is homogeneous due to the vector  being zero. In characteristic form the system is
  with   

To simplify these characteristic equations we can make the transformations such that 

which form

An integrating factor  can be multiplied in to help integrate this. So the system now has the characteristic form
 on  

which is equivalent to the diagonal system
 

The solution of this system can be given by the generalized hodograph method.

Example

Consider the one-dimensional Euler equations written in terms of density  and velocity  are

with  being the speed of sound is introduced on account of isentropic assumption. Write this system in matrix form

where the matrix  from the analysis above the eigenvalues and eigenvectors need to be found. The eigenvalues are found to satisfy

to give

and the eigenvectors are found to be

where the Riemann invariants are

For perfect gas with constant specific heats, there is the relation , where  is the specific heat ratio, to give the Riemann invariants

to give the equations

In other words, 

This can be solved by the hodograph transformation. In the hodographic plane, if all the characteristics collapses into a single curve, then we obtain simple waves. If the matrix form of the system of pde's is in the form

See also
Simple wave

References 

Invariant theory
Partial differential equations
Conservation equations
Bernhard Riemann